The Sint-Pieters-Leeuw Tower, sometimes called the VRT-toren, although there are several by that name, is a  free standing tower at Sint-Pieters-Leeuw, on the outskirts of Brussels, Belgium, built between 1991 and 1994. It is the tallest free standing structure in Belgium. The tower's location, south-west of Brussels, was chosen for its central location in Belgium and to minimize hindrance to Brussels Airport beyond the opposite end of the city. The tower is owned by Norkring België.

After its construction, it emerged that the tower was built illegally, due to irregularities in the building permits. There were complaints against it as locals feel the unpainted concrete is an eyesore, and it has even been suggested that the tower may be demolished. In April 2007, the irregularities were straightened out and the tower has retroactively acquired the legal permit to be built.

See also
 List of towers
 Vlaamse Radio- en Televisieomroeporganisatie

References

External links
 http://www.rohde-schwarz.com/WWW/Publicat.nsf/article/n151_fmtv/$file/n151_fmtv.pdf
 
 https://web.archive.org/web/20051016033436/http://www.vanderspek-bel.com/Casestories/BRTN/enBRTN.htm
  https://web.archive.org/web/20060513100837/http://www.degregorio.be/MiniSite/Pagina.aspx?MSID=140&UID=179

Towers in Belgium
Norkring
1994 establishments in Belgium
Towers completed in 1994